Anthony Guise (born 5 March 1985) is a French footballer who plays as a striker. He appeared in Ligue 1 for Arles-Avignon.

References

1985 births
AC Arlésien players
Association football forwards
French footballers
Ligue 1 players
Ligue 2 players
Living people
Luzenac AP players